Bruce Joseph Grocott, Baron Grocott PC (born 1 November 1940) is a Labour Party politician in the United Kingdom.

Early life
Grocott was born in Kings Langley near Watford, and was educated at the University of Leicester. He obtained an MA from Manchester University after conducting research on Local Government. He was appointed to the post of lecturer, and later a senior lecturer, at the City of Birmingham College of Commerce (later Birmingham Polytechnic, now Birmingham City University). During this time he was elected to Bromsgrove Urban District Council. From 1972 to 1974 he was a principal lecturer at North Staffordshire Polytechnic.

Parliamentary career
His first attempt to become a member of Parliament was in the 1970 election when he stood unsuccessfully for South West Hertfordshire. He was then selected as a candidate and was elected as Member of Parliament for Lichfield and Tamworth in October 1974, in which position he became Parliamentary Private Secretary to the Minister for Local Government and Planning, and later the Minister of Agriculture. He lost his seat at the 1979 general election and joined Central Television as a presenter and producer, working on programmes such as Left, Right and Centre, Central Lobby and Central Weekend.

He was re-elected for The Wrekin in 1987 and he was very shortly thereafter appointed Deputy Shadow Leader of the House to Jack Cunningham before becoming advisor to the Leader of the Opposition, Neil Kinnock and, later, a Foreign Affairs Spokesman under John Smith. He served as Parliamentary Private Secretary to Tony Blair from 1994 until 2001.

He transferred to Telford in 1997 when The Wrekin was divided. He served this seat until the 2001 general election, when he stepped down from the Commons.

House of Lords
He was made a life peer under the title of Baron Grocott, of Telford, in the County of Shropshire, on 2 July 2001, quickly being promoted to a government whip in the House of Lords. From 2002 to 2008 he was the Government Chief Whip in the House of Lords as well as Captain of the Gentlemen-at-Arms, the honorary post usually held by the Chief Whip. As the Chief Whip, he was sworn of the Privy Council in 2002. He has promoted further reform of the Lords, including attempts to abolish by-elections for hereditary peers.

In October 2012 it was announced that Lord Grocott has been elected as the next chancellor of the University of Leicester, the first time in the university's history that a former student has been appointed to the post. He was installed as chancellor at the degree ceremony in DeMontfort Hall on 24 January 2013. His term finished in July 2018 and he was replaced by Lord Willetts.

Family
Grocott is married with two sons and lives in Staffordshire.

References

External links 
 Short interview giving his views on House of Lords reform
 

|-

|-

|-

|-

|-

|-

|-

1940 births
Living people
Academics of Birmingham City University
Academics of Staffordshire University
Alumni of the University of Leicester
Alumni of the University of Manchester
British television presenters
Honourable Corps of Gentlemen at Arms
Labour Party (UK) life peers
Labour Party (UK) MPs for English constituencies
Members of the Privy Council of the United Kingdom
Members of the Parliament of the United Kingdom for constituencies in Shropshire
Parliamentary Private Secretaries to the Prime Minister
UK MPs 1974–1979
UK MPs 1987–1992
UK MPs 1992–1997
UK MPs 1997–2001
Life peers created by Elizabeth II